Super-Sonic Jazz is the second studio album by Sun Ra, recorded in 1956 at RCA Studios, Chicago. Super-Sonic Jazz was the first album to be released on Saturn Records, the label run by Sun Ra and Alton Abraham, and was one of only three albums by Sun Ra to have been available in the 1950s. (The other two are Jazz by Sun Ra, also released in 1957, and Jazz in Silhouette, released May 1959.)

The album was retitled as Super-Sonic Sounds when it was reissued in 1974 by Impulse!, but reverted to its original title when it was released on CD by Evidence records in 1992.

Background

El Saturn Records 
Super-Sonic Jazz was the first album to be released on El Saturn Records, the label run by Sun Ra and his business partner Alton Abraham. Set up in 1955, they released their first singles, including a doo-wop group The Cosmic Rays and the Arkestra's Saturn, at the beginning of 1956, and had recorded the whole of their first album by the end of the year, to be released in March 1957. El Saturn is now considered, along with Charles Mingus and Max Roach’s Debut label and Harry Partch’s Gate 5 label, "one of the very first and most active artist-owned record labels." Often pressed in editions of 75 — sometimes as few as 20 were made for specific concerts — the records would be manufactured using local black businesses, and often put together in Abraham's own home. As John F. Szwed described,

Recording 
The album was primarily recorded between September and October of 1956, with a handful of tracks recorded prior to the Jazz by Sun Ra sessions used to fill out the album.

Track listing

Musicians 

Sun Ra –  Piano, Electric Piano, Space Gong on all tracks except 'Springtime in Chicago'
Art Hoyle – Trumpet, Percussion on all tracks except 'Super Blonde', 'Soft Talk', 'Medicine for a Nightmare', and 'Advice to Medics'
Pat Patrick – Alto Sax on all tracks except 'Springtime in Chicago,' 'Super Blonde', 'Soft Talk', 'Medicine for a Nightmare', and 'Advice to Medics', Percussion on all tracks except  'Super Blonde', 'Soft Talk', 'Medicine for a Nightmare', and 'Advice to Medics',
John Gilmore –  Tenor Sax on all tracks except 'Springtime in Chicago', Percussion on all tracks except 'Soft Talk', 'Medicine for a Nightmare', and 'Advice to Medics'
Charles Davis – Baritone Sax & Percussion on all tracks except 'Springtime in Chicago', 'Super Blonde', 'Soft Talk', 'Medicine for a Nightmare', and 'Advice to Medics'
Victor Sproles –  Bass on all tracks except 'Springtime in Chicago', 'Super Blonde', 'Soft Talk', 'Medicine for a Nightmare', and 'Advice to Medics'
William Cochran –  Drums on all tracks except 'Springtime in Chicago', 'Super Blonde', 'Soft Talk', 'Medicine for a Nightmare', and 'Advice to Medics'
Jim Herndon – Tympani & Percussion on tracks except 'Springtime in Chicago'

Guests 
Julian Priester – Trombone on 'Springtime in Chicago,' 'Super Blonde', 'Soft Talk', 'Medicine for a Nightmare', and 'Advice to Medics'
Wilburn Green – Electric Bass on 'Springtime in Chicago,' 'Super Blonde', 'Soft Talk', 'Medicine for a Nightmare', and 'Advice to Medics'
Robert Barry – Drums on 'Springtime in Chicago,' 'Super Blonde', 'Soft Talk', 'Medicine for a Nightmare', and 'Advice to Medics'
James Scales – Alto Sax & Percussion on 'Springtime in Chicago'

Mixed at RCA studios, Chicago, February 14, 1957, and released in March with an initial pressing of 500.

References

External links
Complete Sun Ra's Discography
 An Essay by John Corbett on Ra's Saturn label
 Pathways to Unknown Worlds: Sun Ra, El Saturn & Chicago's Afro-Futurist Underground, 1954-68, an exhibition about early Saturn activities
 A Review of Pathways to Unknown Worlds exhibition
 Saturn record catalogues from 1967 and 1969

Sun Ra albums
1956 albums
Impulse! Records albums
Evidence Music albums
El Saturn Records albums